Local elections were held in Kazakhstan in 2021. The first was on 10 January 2021 and the second on 25 July 2021.

 January 2021 Kazakh local elections
 July 2021 Kazakh local elections

2021 elections in Kazakhstan